This is a list of people from Rancho Cucamonga, California.
 Carlos Bocanegra, former center back, left back for Stade Rennais, grew up in Alta Loma and attended Alta Loma High School currentlynserving as technical director and vice president for Atlanta United.
 Tom Brunansky, former Major League Baseball player
 Charles Castronovo, internationally renowned opera singer, was raised in Rancho Cucamonga, and attended Alta Loma High School
 Patrick Chung, former University of Oregon safety, 2009 New England Patriots second-round draft pick, attended Rancho Cucamonga High School
 Kenyon Coleman, former NFL football player grew up in Alta Loma and attended Alta Loma High School
 Darren Collison, former NBA point guard; went to Etiwanda High School
 Collin Delia, Chicago Blackhawks goaltender
 Maurice Edu, former Maryland soccer player and the #1 overall selection in the 2007 MLS SuperDraft by Toronto FC; went to Etiwanda High School
 Rollie Fingers, former Major League Baseball pitcher and Hall of Famer, lived in Cucamonga and attended Chaffey College
 Oz Fox, lead guitarist for the Christian heavy metal band Stryper, lives in Rancho Cucamonga
 Lionel Manuel, former New York Giants wide receiver who played seven seasons in the NFL, grew up in Rancho Cucamonga
 Nichkhun, American born ethnic Thai-Chinese member of popular South Korean boy-band 2PM
 Woodworker Sam Maloof lived in Alta Loma; his work is featured in museums around the United States, including the Smithsonian Institution. His home is a State of California historical landmark. During the construction of the 210 Foothill Freeway, Maloof's home was moved from the 210 freeway corridor to the top of Carnelian Street, where it is now a museum. 
 Tatiana Suarez Padilla, UFC TUF MMA Fighter
 Trevor Penick, member of boy band O-Town, which debuted in 2000
 Leah Pruitt, American professional soccer player, was born in Rancho Cucamonga and attended Alta Loma High School.
 Matt Rogers, football coach, television host of Really Big Things and There Goes the Neighborhood on the Discovery Channel and American Idol contestant, was born in 1978 in Rancho Cucamonga and still lives there.
 Rufio, alternative rock band, formed in 2000
 C. J. Stroud, quarterback for the Ohio State Buckeyes and 2021 Heisman finalist, attended Rancho Cucamonga High School
 Craig Traylor, actor who played Stevie on Malcolm in the Middle, lives in Rancho Cucamonga
 Andrew Vasquez, professional baseball pitcher for the Minnesota Twins
 Eric Weddle, Baltimore Ravens' safety, lived in Rancho Cucamonga, attended Alta Loma 
 Kendall Williams, basketball player for University of New Mexico and Victoria Libertas Pesaro
 Matt and Nick Jackson, professional wrestlers collectively known as the Young Bucks
 Young Noble, rapper, born in Rancho Cucamonga
 Frank Zappa, musician who lived in and worked in Cucamonga during the early 1960s. He bought the Pal Recording Studio from a friend, Paul Buff, and renamed it "Studio Z".  The studio closed in 1964 when the building was demolished in order to widen Archibald Avenue. ("Cucamonga" is also the name of a long-lived radio show on Radio 1, Belgium, as an obscure reference to Zappa.)

References

Rancho Cucamonga, California
 
Rancho Cuc